Tavakkol-e Karim Kola (also Romanized as Tavakkol-e Karīm Kolā; also known as Tavakkol) is a village in Karipey Rural District, Lalehabad District, Babol County, Mazandaran Province, Iran. At the 2006 census, its population was 98, in 21 families.

References 

Populated places in Babol County